Pierre (Peter) Julien Ortiz OBE (July 5, 1913 – May 16, 1988) was a United States Marine Corps colonel who received two Navy Crosses for extraordinary heroism as a major in World War II. He served in North Africa and Europe during the war, as a member of the French Foreign Legion, the U.S. Marines and the Office of Strategic Services (OSS), operating behind enemy lines several times. Ortiz also acted in Hollywood films after the war. He was one of very few U.S. Marines to serve in combat in Europe during World War II, and one of the most decorated Marine officers of the war.

Early life
Ortiz was born in New York to an American mother of Swiss descent and a French-born Spanish father. He was educated at the University of Grenoble in France. He spoke ten languages, including English, Spanish, French, Italian, Portuguese, German and Arabic.

French Foreign Legion
On February 1, 1932, at the age of 19, Ortiz joined the French Foreign Legion for five years' service in North Africa. He was sent to the Legion's training camp at Sidi Bel-Abbes in French Algeria. He later served in Morocco, where he was promoted to corporal in 1933 and sergeant in 1935. He was awarded the Croix de Guerre twice during a campaign against the Riffian people. He also received the Médaille militaire. As an acting lieutenant, he was offered a commission as a second lieutenant if he re-enlisted. Instead, when his contract expired in 1937, he returned to the United States to serve as a technical adviser for war films in Hollywood.

World War II
With the outbreak of World War II and the United States still neutral, Ortiz re-enlisted in the French Foreign Legion in October 1939 as a sergeant, receiving a battlefield commission in May 1940. He was wounded while blowing up a fuel dump and captured by the Germans during the 1940 Battle of France. He escaped the following year via Lisbon and made his way to the United States.

Ortiz enlisted in the U.S. Marine Corps on June 22, 1942. As a result of his training and experience, he was commissioned as a second lieutenant after only 40 days in service. He was promoted to captain on December 3. With his knowledge of the region, he was sent to Tangier, Morocco. He conducted reconnaissance behind enemy lines in Tunisia for the Office of Strategic Services (OSS). At the time, though most of Morocco was a French protectorate, Tangiers was a protectorate of neutral Spain. During a night mission, Ortiz's right hand was seriously wounded in an encounter with a German patrol and he was sent back to the United States to recover.

In 1943, Ortiz became a member of the OSS. On January 6, 1944, he was dropped by parachute into the Haute-Savoie region of German-occupied France as part of the three-man "Union" mission, with Colonel Pierre Fourcaud of the French secret service and Captain Thackwaite from the British Special Operations Executive, to evaluate the capabilities of the Resistance and train the Maquis du Vercors in the Alpine region. He drove four downed RAF pilots to the border of neutral Spain before leaving France with his team in late May.

Promoted to major, Ortiz parachuted back into France on August 1, 1944, this time as the commander of the "Union II" mission. He was captured by the Germans on August 16. In April 1945, he and three other prisoners of war escaped while being moved to another camp, but after ten days with little or no food, returned to their old camp after discovering that the prisoners had virtually taken control. On April 29, the camp was liberated.

Ortiz rose to the rank of lieutenant colonel in the Marine Corps Reserve. He was released from active duty in 1946 and returned to Hollywood. In April 1954, he volunteered to return to active duty to serve as a Marine observer in Indochina. The Marine Corps did not accept his request because "current military policies will not permit the assignment requested." On March 1, 1955, he retired from the Marine Corps and was promoted to the rank of colonel on the retirement list because he was decorated in combat.

Colonel Ortiz was awarded 24 medals in all from three countries.

Navy Cross citations

Citation:

Citation:

Acting
Upon returning to civilian life, Ortiz became an actor. He appeared in a number of films, several with director John Ford, including Rio Grande, in which he played "Captain St. Jacques". According to his son, Marine Lieutenant Colonel Peter J. Ortiz, Jr., "My father was an awful actor but he had great fun appearing in movies". After serving as technical advisor in 13 Rue Madeleine (1947), he did so again in the film Operation Secret (1952), which was based on his World War II exploits. Ortiz had no control over the script of the film, in which he was portrayed by Cornel Wilde, and "wasn't too happy with the result." He told columnist Bob Thomas that "they had stipulated that I was to help in the screenplay but never consulted me."

Ortiz's acting career floundered during the 1950s, and in 1955 he advertised for work in movie trade publications. Ortiz lived in a small tract house in Tarzana, California with his wife and 19-month-old son. He told Aline Mosby of United Press International that a movie producer had promised to promote his career when he appeared on the radio program This Is Your Life in 1951, but that promised opportunities in film had not materialized and that he had only obtained work as an extra. His ad said that he was "willing and able to do anything".

Death
Ortiz died of cancer on May 16, 1988, at the age of 74 and was buried at Arlington National Cemetery, Plot: Section 59 Site 1269. He was survived by his wife Jean and their son Peter J. Ortiz Jr.

In August 1994, the village of Montgirod, in the Auvergne-Rhône-Alpes region of France, renamed its town hall square the "Place du Colonel Peter Ortiz".

Military decorations
Ortiz was the most highly decorated member of the OSS. His decorations and medals include:

United States
  Navy Cross with gold star 
  Legion of Merit
  Purple Heart with gold star 
  American Campaign Medal
  European-African-Middle Eastern Campaign Medal
  World War II Victory Medal
  Marine Corps Reserve Ribbon
  Parachutist Badge

United Kingdom
  Officer of the Order of the British Empire

France
  Chevalier of the Legion of Honor
  Médaille militaire
  Croix de Guerre des théâtres d'opérations extérieures with bronze and silver stars
  Croix de Guerre 1939-1945 with two bronze palms and silver star
  Croix du combattant
  Médaille des Évadés
  Médaille Coloniale with the campaign clasp: "MAROC"
  Médaille des Blesses
  1939–1945 Commemorative war medal (France)

Morocco
  Order of Ouissam Alaouite

Filmography

See also

 Mustang (military officer)
 List of United States Marines
 List of Foreign Legionnaires
 French Foreign Legion

References

External links
 Peter Julien Ortiz, arlingtoncemetery.net, an unofficial website
 "Herringbone Cloak – GI Dagger: Marines of the OSS"
 

1913 births
1988 deaths
Recipients of the Navy Cross (United States)
Recipients of the Legion of Merit
Soldiers of the French Foreign Legion
United States Marine Corps colonels
Military personnel from New York City
Recipients of the Croix de Guerre (France)
People of the Office of Strategic Services
Burials at Arlington National Cemetery
Chevaliers of the Légion d'honneur
Grenoble Alpes University alumni
United States Marine Corps reservists
American male film actors
20th-century American male actors
United States Marine Corps personnel of World War II
American prisoners of war in World War II
World War II prisoners of war held by Germany
Recipients of the Médaille militaire (France)
Officers of the Order of the British Empire